WARP-CD, virtual channel 20 (UHF digital channel 22), is a low-powered, Class A television station licensed to Tampa, Florida, United States. The station is owned by the Sunshine Broadcasting Company.

History
WARP originally began as an affiliate of The Box until that network's acquisition by Viacom in 2001, it became MTV2. Since then, the station began to broadcast more infomercials on its schedule.

Broadcasting on a tower on Gandy Boulevard in St. Petersburg, adjacent to Goodwill, WARP broadcasts on an east–west beam, towards central Pinellas County and Tampa, to protect the signals of Gainesville's ABC affiliate WCJB-TV and Fort Myers' NBC affiliate WBBH-TV, both also broadcasting on channel 20.

The station, previously WARP-CA, began broadcasting a digital-only signal in late 2009.

WARP-CA's call sign suffix (CA for Class A) was changed to WARP-CD (Class A Digital) automatically upon grant of WARP-CA's digital license in late 2009. WARP-CD currently broadcasts four channels of standard-definition digital television: 20.1, 20.2, 20.3 and 20.4.

Longtime owner Randolph Weigner (who controls Sunshine Broadcasting Company) sold WARP, along with sister station WPHA-CD in Philadelphia, to LocusPoint Networks in November 2012. The deal made WARP a sister station to WSVT-LD, which LocusPoint acquired a month later.

External links

External links 

ARP-CD
Low-power television stations in the United States